The Hamilton Whizzers were a junior ice hockey team in the Ontario Hockey Association for one season in  1942-1943. The team was based in Hamilton, Ontario, playing home games at the Barton Street Arena, also known as the Hamilton Forum. The Whizzers finished third in the league. The following year the team was renamed the Hamilton Majors. Two alumni from the Whizzers graduated to play in the National Hockey League.

NHL alumni
Walt Atanas, Stan Kemp

Yearly results

External links
 Hamilton Forum - The OHL Arena & Travel Guide

1942 establishments in Ontario
1944 disestablishments in Ontario
Defunct Ontario Hockey League teams
Ice hockey clubs established in 1942
Ice hockey clubs disestablished in 1944
Ice hockey teams in Hamilton, Ontario